The Communist Party of Kurdistan – Iraq is a Kurdish political party, formed in 1993 when the Iraqi Communist Party branch in the Kurdish areas was formed into a separate party. The party is led by Kawa Mahmud.

In both the January and December 2005 Iraqi legislative elections the party was part of the Democratic Patriotic Alliance of Kurdistan. The party has a women's wing, the Kurdistan Women's League, whose leader Nahla Hussain al-Shaly was murdered in Kirkuk in 2008. It also has an Assyrian wing called the Kaldo-Ashur Communist Party based in Ankawa.

Electoral results

Federal parliament

References

External links
 
Press-releases of Kurdistan Communist Party – Iraq at Solidnet.org
Iraqi Opposition

 
Political parties in Kurdistan Region
1993 establishments in Iraq

International Meeting of Communist and Workers Parties